Ambarcık (also: Anbarcık) is a village in the Çavdır District of Burdur Province in Turkey. Its population is 377 (2021).

References

Villages in Çavdır District